Super Singer 9 is a 2022 Indian Tamil-language reality television singing competition show. The ninth (9th) season of the Super Singer show, which airs on Star Vijay and streams on Disney+ Hotstar on every Saturday and Sunday at 6:30 PM  starting from November 19th 2022. MRF Vapocure Paints is the main sponsor for this season.

Makapa Anand and Priyanka Deshpande return as hosts once again for this season. The judging panel consists of four popular playback singers, Anuradha Sriram, P. Unnikrishnan, Shweta Mohan, and Benny Dayal.

Format
The show begins with a mega musical battle with auditioned top 20 contestants of this season. Each contestant is ranked based on their performance and the top scorer will be given a spot in the super 5 zone.  Position in the super five zone keeps changing based on their performance week on week. As contestants are eliminated, the super five zone will become super three zone.

Judges

Hosts

Episodes 
Weekly , Super singer has introduced special guests during the season such as Deva (composer),  Sam C. S., S. P. Charan , S. P. Sailaja, Khushbu, Varalaxmi Sarathkumar, Santhosh Prathap, RJ Balaji, K. S. Chithra , Meenakshi Elayaraja, Meena (actress), Haricharan, Santhosh Narayanan, Shakthisree Gopalan, Vijay Yesudas, Sujatha Mohan.

Contestants

References

External links
 Super Singer 9 on Hotstar
 

Star Vijay original programming
2022 Tamil-language television seasons
Tamil-language singing talent shows
Tamil-language reality television series
Tamil-language television shows
Television shows set in Tamil Nadu
Airtel Super Singer seasons